Sir Charles Geoffrey Cox  (born 30 April 1960) is a British Conservative Party politician and barrister serving as Member of Parliament (MP) for Torridge and West Devon since the 2005 general election. Cox worked as a barrister from 1982 onwards and was appointed Queen's Counsel in 2003, two years before his election to Parliament. He served as Attorney General for England and Wales and Advocate General for Northern Ireland under Prime Ministers Theresa May and Boris Johnson from 2018 to 2020.

Early life

Charles Geoffrey Cox was born in Wroughton, Wiltshire on 30 April 1960 to Michael (a Royal Artillery Officer) and Diane Cox. He was educated at King's College, Taunton, a private school in Somerset. He studied law and classics at Downing College, Cambridge.

Legal career

Called to the Bar at the Middle Temple in 1982, Cox started practice as a barrister; in 1992 he co-founded Thomas More Chambers, as its Head of Chambers. He was appointed Queen's Counsel in 2003.

For part of his career as a barrister, Cox was Standing Counsel to the government of the Indian Ocean island nation of Mauritius. His cases have included "civil fraud and asset recovery, commercial, human rights, defamation, and judicial review actions". He has appeared as leading counsel in the Supreme Court or the Privy Council, and he was increasingly instructed to lead in commercial actions and arbitrations overseas, appearing in the DIFC, Mauritius and the Cayman Islands.

His criminal cases have included the Jubilee line corruption trial; representing Virendra Rastogi the owner of RBG Resources; and successfully defending a member of the Queen's Lancashire Regiment who had been accused of war crimes related to the death of Baha Mousa.

In 2014, Cox successfully defended the former Premier (and current  Speaker of the Legislative Assembly) of the Cayman Islands, McKeeva Bush, on charges of corruption and misuse of office. In March 2015, Cox successfully defended the deputy Editor of The Sun, Geoff Webster, in a trial of four journalists resulting from Operation Elveden. The jury had to decide at what point the behaviour of those on trial could be considered a criminal rather than a serious disciplinary matter; even the lawyers found this difficult to define. Cox subsequently publicly criticised the vagueness of the law, and its disproportionate use that had led to the prosecution.

Parliamentary career

Cox was first selected to stand for Parliament in 2000 by the Torridge and West Devon Conservatives. In the following 2001 general election, he came second to incumbent Liberal Democrat John Burnett by 1,194 votes.

After the 2001 election, Cox was reselected. Burnett announced in 2003 that he would not contest the seat again, and at the 2005 general election Cox defeated the new Liberal Democrat candidate, David Walter, gaining a majority of 3,236. Cox made his maiden speech in the House of Commons on 28 June 2005.

Cox was re-elected as MP for Torridge and West Devon at the 2015 general election with an increased majority of 18,403 votes (32.5%). This majority increased by over 2,000 votes at the 2017 election to 20,686 (34.7%).

In January 2016, it was reported he had a number of office expense claims for items, such as a 49 pence pint of milk, rejected by the Commons authorities. In response, Cox said that his staff had been unaware of a recent change in the rules for office expenses, which no longer permitted office hospitality items such as tea, coffee or milk to be claimed.

In February 2016, Cox told the House of Commons that he had concluded, after examining the published renegotiation proposals, that the case for leaving the EU was now overwhelming and that he would vote to do so in the forthcoming referendum.

On 9 July 2018, Cox was appointed to the Cabinet as Her Majesty's Attorney General for England and Wales and Advocate General for Northern Ireland.

In the House of Commons he has sat on the Environment, Food and Rural Affairs Select committee, the Committee on Standards and the Committee on Privileges. Cox resigned from the latter role in 2016 after registering more than £400,000 of outside earnings within the time limit.

In the 2019 general election, Cox was re-elected with 60.1% of the vote and a majority of 24,992 (41.8%).

Attorney General

On 9 July 2018, Theresa May appointed Cox as Attorney General taking over from Jeremy Wright following a Cabinet reshuffle, prompted by the resignations of David Davis and Boris Johnson.

On 1 December 2018, The Sunday Times newspaper reported the leaked contents of a recent Geoffrey Cox letter to Cabinet Ministers detailing the Attorney General's legal advice on Theresa May's Brexit deal. The newspaper reported that his legal advice declared the Withdrawal agreement's backstop protocol would mean the UK being indefinitely locked into a customs union with the EU if future negotiations collapse and that the only way the UK could leave the Backstop would be the signing of a future trade deal which could take many years to complete. The former Brexit Secretary Dominic Raab and three serving Cabinet members confirmed the contents of the letter to the Sunday Times.

In February 2019, Theresa May placed Cox in charge of negotiating changes to the Northern Ireland backstop in the EU withdrawal agreement.

On 24 September 2019, the Supreme Court of the United Kingdom ruled unanimously that Prime Minister Boris Johnson's prorogation of parliament was unlawful, overturning the High Court's judgment, given by the Lord Chief Justice, in the government's favour. On the same day, minutes of a conference call between cabinet ministers (which included Cox) were leaked to Sky News. The minutes of the call, which took place after the prorogation had been approved by the Queen, detailed that Cox briefly told the cabinet at that time that in his view the prorogation was lawful and constitutional and that any accusations of unlawfulness "were motivated by political considerations". Cox's full advice to the Government has not been published, as per precedent to protect government legal advice being prone to influence. The next day Cox appeared in the House of Commons to answer an urgent question on the Government's legal advice and on the implications of the Supreme Court's decision. Cox rebutted calls for him to resign and criticisms of the Government's position, stating that senior and distinguished judges had agreed with the Government's view that the issue was not justiciable and chiding MPs for refusing to agree to a means of the UK leaving the EU while repeatedly preventing the House of Commons from dissolving for an election.

In February 2020, Cox said the public is concerned about the creeping "judicialisation of politics" and said people were right to worry that unelected officials were making decisions that ought to be taken by Parliament. He promised there would not be radical reforms. He stated his opposition to the highly politicised US selection process of Supreme Court and suggested he preferred the Canadian system. Cox said that "there's a case for looking at how supreme court judges are appointed... There's a committee of the Canadian parliament that carries out interviews [of candidates]."

On 13 February 2020, in a Cabinet reshuffle, Cox was dismissed as Attorney General, at the request of the Prime Minister, Boris Johnson, and replaced by Suella Braverman.

He was knighted in the 2021 New Year Honours for parliamentary and political service.

Outside work whilst an MP

Cox has continued to practise as a Queen's Counsel / King's Counsel whilst an MP. According to The Daily Telegraph, based on the declarations in the Register of Members' Interests, Cox's extra-parliamentary work was worth £820,867 in 2014, or 12 times his annual MP salary, while the total time on extra-parliamentary work that was registered in 2014 (although the register shows the hours were worked over 3 years) was 1,954 hours.

Cox has previously defended his outside work, pointing out that MPs of all parties have practised as QCs / KCs over the years, and that the Attorney General and Solicitor General are normally chosen from their ranks. He has argued that he has always been used to long hours, 70 and 80 hour weeks were quite normal at the Bar, and that the Nolan report concluded that Parliament needed people with current experience of a wide range of professional and other backgrounds.

In 2016, the House of Commons Standards Committee—of which he was a member—found that he had committed a serious breach of a House of Commons rule, designed to make transparent an MP's financial interests, after failing to register £400k of outside earnings (11 payments) for legal work within the permitted 28-day period. Cox registered the payments late, variously between two and seven months after the deadline; he said that he had omitted to prioritise the rule in the midst of an intense political and professional schedule. When first registering the payments, in September 2015, Cox drew attention to and apologised to the Registrar for his omission, referring himself to the Parliamentary Commissioner, and stepped down from the committee. The Commissioner and the Committee accepted that the payments had not in fact given rise to any conflicts of interest and that the failure to register the payments within 28 days had thus had no practical effect. Alistair Graham, the former Chairman of the Committee on Standards in Public Life, criticised the lack of punishment and called for a complete reform, while Martin Bell said the Committee on Standards had a long history of inflicting light punishment, which showed that the House was incapable of regulating itself.

On 9 July 2018, Cox gave up all private practice upon his appointment as Attorney General, but resumed sometime after being sacked in February 2020, working as "consultant global counsel" to the international law firm Withers LLP. He earned "£468,000 a year for 48 hours of work per month" including over £150,000 for advising the government of the British Virgin Islands about alleged corruption in a case bought by the Foreign Office. Beginning on 26 April 2021, Cox spent one month in the Caribbean and with the permission of the chief whip, continued to vote in Parliament via proxy due to the coronavirus lockdown.

In January 2023, Sky News said that Cox had, since the 2019 general election, earnt more than £2 million in addition to his salary as an MP – the second-highest amount of any MP, with only former Prime Minister Theresa May having earnt more.

Attorney for suspect in tax fraud case

On 10 December 2019, Danish media claimed that Geoffrey Cox, as a leading barrister and based on his financial interest declaration to Parliament, had earned £380,000 (3.4 million DKK) in legal fees during the years 2015–2017 for representing Sanjay Shah, a Dubai-based British businessman and prime suspect in what is reported to have been the largest tax fraud case Denmark had ever seen. Shah and his legal team said that he only exploited legal loopholes which Denmark had failed to close.

Preben Bang Henriksen, chairman of the legal affairs committee of the Danish Parliament, claimed that Cox's engagement for Shah posed a conflict of interest or disqualification issue because the Danish investigation is dependent on British assistance. Henriksen feared that the ties between Shah and Cox "might discourage British authorities from investigating the case as thoroughly as it evidently needed to be". A spokesman for Cox rejected that Cox had influenced the investigation in Britain or Denmark, since a system at the Attorney General office would prevent conflicts of interest because Cox would not take part in any decisions within cases where he had previously been involved as a lawyer.

Personal life

Cox lives in rural West Devon, near Tavistock, and London. As with the majority of MPs who do not represent a constituency close to Parliament, he maintains accommodation on expenses in London for when he is working there. He married Jeanie MacDonald in 1985 and they have one daughter and two sons.

Tax avoidance allegations

In September 2014, it was reported that Cox was one of a number of individuals investing in the Phoenix Film Partners LLC scheme run by Ingenious PLC which HM Revenue and Customs (HMRC) had alleged to be a tax avoidance scheme. Ingenious has contested the allegation and claimed the scheme had been submitted to HMRC for pre-approval and that HMRC had not raised any objections. Cox has said that if the scheme was a tax avoidance scheme, it would have contradicted his instructions to his financial advisers, that he did not wish to be involved in aggressive tax avoidance. Following a string of court victories against the schemes, HMRC has since sought to settle disputes with those involved in the tax avoidance, with an agreed re-payment package. In January 2016 Ingenious PLC was reported to still be disputing the claims.

Honours

References

External links 

 Geoffrey Cox KC MP – Parliamentary site
 
 Thomas More Chambers – Chambers of Geoffrey Cox QC MP
 Conservative Party – Geoffrey Cox MP – biography
 Torridge and West Devon Conservatives – constituency site
 Geoffrey Cox for Torridge and West Devon – 2015 campaign website
 Geoffrey Cox – Conservative Candidate for Torridge and West Devon – 2010 campaign website
 Guardian Unlimited Politics – Ask Aristotle: Geoffrey Cox MP
 Heating grants in November 2007
 Appledore shipyard in November 2006

|-

|-

Conservative Party (UK) MPs for English constituencies
UK MPs 2005–2010
UK MPs 2010–2015
UK MPs 2015–2017
UK MPs 2017–2019
UK MPs 2019–present
Alumni of Downing College, Cambridge
People educated at King's College, Taunton
People from Wroughton
1960 births
Living people
21st-century King's Counsel
English King's Counsel
Knights Bachelor
Politicians awarded knighthoods